Turnt is an American teen drama streaming television series created by Rachel Stern that premiered on August 1, 2018 on Facebook Watch.

Premise
Turnt follows "an ensemble cast of characters as they navigate high school."

Cast and characters
 Madeleine Byrne as Kat
 Jared Scott as Forrest
 Elsie Hewitt as Victoria
 Cristian Oliveras as Danny
 Darren Barnet as Hot Seth
 Isabella Roland as Jess
 Donald Clark as Gabe

Episodes

Production

Development
On August 21, 2017, it was announced that digital production company Brat was developing a new series, entitled Turnt, to be written by Rachel Stern and directed by Will Slocombe. Brat was set to collaborate with talent manager Matt Dugan and digital production company One Push Digital Creative on the series. The series was expected to take place in the fictional "Attaway High" universe where several series produced by Brat would be set in the same high school, exist in the same fictional universe, and feature characters that appear across multiple series. On July 20, 2018, it was reported that Brat had sold the series to Facebook, making Turnt one of a small handful of series that Brat was producing in order to sell to other platforms. A week later, it was announced that the series would premiere on August 1, 2018 with the release of the first four episodes. The series is expected to release three episodes per week for every week thereafter.

Casting
Alongside the initial series announcement, it was confirmed that Madeleine Byrne, Cristian Oliveras, Elsie Hewitt, and Nate Wyatt would star in the series.

Filming
Principal photography for the series took place in Pasadena, California at a nearby high school which was also used for filming of the other "Attaway High" series.

References

External links

2010s American high school television series
2010s American teen drama television series
2018 American television series debuts
English-language television shows
Facebook Watch original programming
American teen drama web series
Television series about teenagers